Deh-e Bar Aftab may refer to:
 Deh-e Bar Aftab-e Olya
 Deh-e Bar Aftab Vali-ye Jowkar